The 2020–21 EFL League One (referred to as the Sky Bet League One for sponsorship reasons) was the 17th season of Football League One under its current title and the 29th season under its current league division format.

Team changes
The following teams have changed division since the 2019–20 season.

To League One
Promoted from League Two
Swindon Town
Crewe Alexandra
Plymouth Argyle
Northampton Town

Relegated from Championship
Charlton Athletic
Wigan Athletic
Hull City

From League One
Promoted to Championship
Coventry City
Rotherham United
Wycombe Wanderers

Relegated to League Two
Bolton Wanderers
Southend United
Tranmere Rovers

Expelled from the EFL
Bury

Stadiums

Personnel and sponsoring

Managerial changes

League table

Play-offs

First leg
 

Second leg

Final

Results

Season statistics

Top scorers

Hat-tricks

Most assists

Awards

Monthly

Annual 

EFL League One Team of the season

Notes

References

 
EFL League One seasons
2
2
Eng